Roger Duguay is a former Canadian politician and Roman Catholic priest. He sought election to the Legislative Assembly of New Brunswick unsuccessfully on four occasions as a representative of the New Brunswick New Democratic Party (NDP). He served as the New Brunswick NDP's leader from 2007 to 2010.

Political career
Duguay has been a candidate for the NB New Democratic Party on three previous occasions, dating back to the 1991 election.

In 1999, he ran in the riding of Centre-Péninsule.  As a result, he was suspended from his position as a pastor with the Catholic Church for breaking the Diocese's policy on political activity.  Although he was reinstated after the election, he later left the church voluntarily in order to continue his political career.

In the 2006 election, Duguay was the party's most successful candidate, winning 26.1 per cent of the vote in the riding of Miramichi Bay-Neguac. This result led to his successful nomination for the party leadership on October 13, 2007.

In May 2009, the party announced that Duguay would seek the nomination in Tracadie-Sheila.

A Corporate Research Associates poll conducted in June 2009 showed an improvement for the NDP from 13 to 16 percent of decided voters, while a subsequent poll conducted in September 2009 showed a jump to 22 percent. In addition, Duguay's personal popularity rating doubled from 6% to 12% in that three-month period.

Duguay received a 100% vote of confidence in his leadership from the near-100 delegates in attendance for the New Brunswick NDP Biennial Convention, held October 17, 2009.

He stepped down as leader on October 25, 2010 after failing to win a seat in the 2010 general election. On November 2, 2010, Duguay further announced that he would be leaving the NDP altogether because of what he called "feuding" between party members and "outsiders" who had been brought in to run the election campaign.

Duguay was a 2018 Quebec general election candidate for the New Democratic Party of Quebec in the Quebec City provincial electoral district of Taschereau.

Electoral history

|-

|Liberal
|Bernard Thériault
|5,298
|54.4
|-

|Progressive Conservative
|Gilbert Godin
|2,279
|23.4
|-

|New Democrat
|Roger Duguay
|2,167
|22.2

|-

|Progressive Conservative
|Louis-Philippe McGraw
|3,551
|51.8
|-

|Liberal
|Denis Landry
|2,344
|34.2
|-

|New Democrat
|Roger Duguay
|955
|13.9

|-

|Liberal
|Carmel Robichaud
|3,108
|45.3
|-

|Progressive Conservative
|Guy Vautour
|1,963
|28.6
|-

|New Democrat
|Roger Duguay
|1,784
|26.0

|-

|New Democrat
|Roger Duguay
|>371*
|>50*
|-

|New Democrat
|Dennis Atchison
|<371*
|<50*
*The NDP did not release the vote totals of individual candidates, but there were 742 votes cast and Duguay was the winner.

|-

|Progressive Conservative
|Claude Landry
|3,806
|48.8
|-

|New Democrat
|Roger Duguay
|2,511
|32.2
|-

|Liberal
|Norma McGraw
|1,478
|19.0

References

1963 births
Acadian people
Candidates in New Brunswick provincial elections
Living people
New Brunswick New Democratic Party leaders
People from Gloucester County, New Brunswick